Ferdinand of Portugal, later of Eça or Eza ( – Eza?), was the son of Portuguese Infant João, Duke of Valencia de Campos. João, was a son of king Peter I of Portugal with powerful and literary famous for several centuries in several European languages, Galician lady Inés de Castro, "the Queen who ruled after her death".

His father, Infante John, Duke of Valencia de Campos, (Coimbra 1349-Salamanca 1397), buried there, had been legitimized as Infant of Portugal, and became Duque de Valencia de Campos in Castile through his marriage to one of the bastards of bastard king Henry II of Castile. Fernando's father John, had married in 1376, (1st marriage), Castilian lady  Maria Téllez de Menezes, assassinated shortly after in 1378 by her husband, who had been alerted of her apparent unfaithfulness.

Then, he married again in Valencia de Campos in 1378 Constanza de Castilla, Lady of Valencia de Campos, illegitimate daughter of bastard King Enrique II of Castile,  who was therefore the step mother of orphaned Fernando of Portugal, thus becoming consort duke of Valencia de Campos.

Life
He was the 1st Lord of Eza in Galicia, from where he took his surname, corrupted in Portuguese into Eça, and which was given to him by  Fadrique de Castilla, 1st Duke of Arjona who died in prison.

Marriages and issue
It is said Fernando was married or perhaps lived with many wives, all of them alive. Other sources say he married six times, having three or four of them alive at once, but only the name of the sixth wife is known.

Apparently, this sixth one, was Isabel Dávalos, daughter of Pedro López Dávalos, Adelantado of Murcia, and granddaughter of Ruy López Dávalos, Constable of Castile . By her he had:

 Duarte de Eça (born c. 1415), a Clergyman, who had a son by his mistress, issue apparently extinct in male line.
 Pedro de Eça, 1st Alcaide-Mór of Moura, 2nd Lord of Aldeia Galega da Merceana (c. 1430-1492), who married Leonor Casca de Camões (born c. 1420), Heiress of Moura, and had issue, apparently extinct in male line, and also had issue (including Dona Filipa de Eça, abbess of Lorvão Abbey) by unknown women, also apparently extinct in male line.
 Branca de Eça (born c. 1420), married firstly to Vasco Fernandes de Lucena (born c. 1420), by whom she had a daughter who became Abbess of the Monastery of Celas, in Coimbra, and married secondly to João Rodrigues de Azevedo, ?th Lord of a Fonte de Louro (born c. 1410), and had issue
 Inês de Eça (born c. 1450), married as his first wife to (Dom) Garcia de Sousa Chichorro (born c. 1450), and had one son
 Catarina de Eça (born c. 1440, died aft. 1515), Perpetual Abbess of the Monastery of Lorvão, who had issue by Pedro Gomes de Abreu, 5th Lord of Regalados (born c. 1440).

With Leonor de Teive, daughter of João de Teive and Brites de Horta, he had: 
  Fernando de Eça, 1st Alcaide-Mór of Vila Viçosa, in the service of the Duke of Braganza (c. 1410 – Barcelos, Martim, 15 August 1501 or bef. 1513), married to Joana de Saldanha (born c. 1410), and had issue, also had a son by an unknown wife, issue apparently extinct in male line.
 Garcia de Eça, 1st Alcaide-Mór of Muge (born c. 1410), married firstly to Joana de Albergaria (born c. 1410), and had issue, apparently extinct in male line, and married secondly as her first husband to Dona Catarina Coutinho (born c. 1440), without issue
  Leonor da Guerra or de Eça (born c. 1410), married to Galiote Leitão, ?th Lord of Torre de Ota (born c. 1410), nobleman of the Royal Household, and had issue

By another he had: 
 João de Eça, 1st Alcaide-Mór of Moreira, 1st Lord of Aldeia Galega da Merceana (born c. 1420), married to Mécia de Antas (born c. 1420), and had one daughter

By another: 
  Diogo of Eça (born c. 1410), married to Joana da Silva (born c. 1410), without issue
  Brites or Beatriz de Eça (born c. 1415), Abbess of the Monastery of Celas, in Coimbra, who had issue by João Gomes de Abreu, Bishop of Viseu (c. 1410 – 16 February 1482)
  Maria of Portugal, a nun at Saint Clare of Assisi in Porto
  Inês of Portugal (born c. 1415), married to Gonzalo Fernández de Hijar, 1st Lord of el Valle del Jalón (c. 1410–1450), and had issue
 Isabel of Portugal (born c. 1415), married to Juan de Sotomayor (born c. 1410), and had one daughter

By others: 
  João de Eça (died at the Palanque de Tangiers), Commander of Cardiga.
  Diogo de Eça, died young
 Antão de Eça, a monk
 Beatriz of Portugal
  Catarina de Eça
 João de Eça (born c. 1420, died aft. 1475), married to Leonor de Xira (born c. 1420), had a son who died unmarried and without issue, had issue by unknown women, now extinct in male line.

All from different women, it is said that he had 42 children, between sons and daughters.

End of life
In the end of his life he repented and started wearing a rope of the Habit of Saint Francis of Assisi, with which he was buried and which appears in the Coat of Arms of his family in purple with the look of a carbuncule.

References

1378 births
Year of death unknown
House of Burgundy-Portugal
14th-century Portuguese people